Albert and Liberal Arts Halls are a set of two historic buildings located on the campus of Davis & Elkins College at Elkins, Randolph County, West Virginia. The brick Georgian Revival style buildings were built between 1924 and 1926, and planned as a unit of two distinct and separate buildings connected by a graceful stone arcade. They were designed by noted Charleston architect Walter F. Martens.

Originally each building was  stories, with gable roof and dormers, and slightly recessed -story wings.  A fire at the Science Hall (now Albert Hall) in 1956, necessitated removal of the gable roof and a flat roof was installed.  The buildings serve as educational offices and classrooms.  Albert Hall is named for Charles E. Albert, Professor of Physics, who served as president from 1935 to 1939. The complex was listed on the National Register of Historic Places in 1979.

References

Houses on the National Register of Historic Places in West Virginia
Georgian Revival architecture in West Virginia
Houses completed in 1926
Houses in Randolph County, West Virginia
University and college buildings on the National Register of Historic Places in West Virginia
National Register of Historic Places in Randolph County, West Virginia
Davis & Elkins College
Buildings and structures in Elkins, West Virginia